Jalal-Abad (also spelled Dzhalal-Abad, Djalal-Abat, Jalalabat; , Calal-Abat/Jalal-Abat, جالال-ابات) is the administrative and economic centre of Jalal-Abad Region in southwestern Kyrgyzstan. It is situated at the north-eastern end of the Fergana valley along the Kögart river valley, in the foothills of the Babash Ata mountains, very close to the Uzbekistan border.

Overview
Jalal-Abad is known for its mineral springs in its surroundings, and the water from the nearby Azreti-Ayup-Paygambar spa was long believed to cure lepers.  Several Soviet era sanatoriums offer mineral water treatment programs for people with various chronic diseases. Bottled mineral water from the region is sold around the country and abroad.

History 

One of Kyrgyzstan's main branches of the Silk Road passed through Jalalabat and the region has played host to travelers for thousands of years, although few archaeological remains are visible today – except in some of the more remote parts of the region – such as Saimalu Tash and the Chatkal valley.  These have included travelers, traders, tourists and pilgrims (to the various holy sights) and sick people visiting the curative spas such as in the Ayub Tau mountain, at the altitude of 700 m above sea level some three kilometers out of town.

There is a legend that the water from the Azreti-Ayup-Paygambar (the Prophet Job) spa cured lepers.  According to the legend there was a grave, a mosque and the khan's palace near the spa.

-abad is a Persian suffix often used in city names in Persianate societies to refer to the person who founded the community.  It is said that Jalalabat was named after Jalal ad Din, who was renowned for setting up Caravanserais to serve travelers and many pilgrims who came to the holy mountain. 

In early 19th century a small Kokand fortress was built, and a small kishlak grew up around this.  The local people were engaged in agriculture and trade and provided services to the pilgrims visiting the spas. Then, in the 1870s, Russian settlers came to the region.  They set up a garrison town and military hospital.

Population

Climate
Jalal-Abad has a hot, dry-summer continental climate (Dsa) according to the Köppen climate classification. There is more rainfall in winter than in summer. About  of precipitation falls annually.

Economy 
The train line (a rarity in Kyrgyzstan), runs from the Ferghana Valley northeast about 30 km to Kökjanggak.

Biggest Companies: Kyrgyz-Canada JV "Kyrgyz Petroleum Company", АО «Kelechek», АО «Nur». AOZT «KyrgyzChlopok», JV «Ak-Altyn» process cotton. There are the tobacco-curing companies «Tura-Ai» Ltd and  «Aziz-Tabak» Ltd., that export 90% of their output to 17 countries. There are also mill houses АО «Azrat Ayib», AOZT PTK «Intershaq», «Mariam & Co» ltd, and the liquor manufacturer AOZT «Jalalabat Arak Zavodu».

Tourism 

The Jalal-Abad Region is known for its walnuts and scenery. Local sites include the Arslanbob Waterfalls and Sary-Chelek Nature Reserve and Lake.  In the city itself, sites include the town square and the culture park, which contains various sculptures and Jalalabad's theater.

See also

References

External links

 Jalal-Abad official website

Populated places in Jalal-Abad Region